This Thangal of Pambankulam was the seventh among the Primary Nizhal Thangals (places of worship). It is west of Kadambankulam in the Tirunelveli-Kanyakumari National Highway east of Panakkudy. 

A thangal was constructed during the  'Desa-sanjara'  of Vaikundar. It was called the Pattakasalai Pathi.

See also

 Pathi
 Worship centers of Ayyavazhi

References

 K. Amalan, Ayya Vaikundar Punitha Varlaru, Akilam Pathippakam, 2000.
 G. Patrick, Religion and Subaltern Agency, University of Madras, 2003.

Nizhal Thangals